Emil Tabakov (born August 21, 1947) is a Bulgarian conductor, composer and double-bass player.

Life and career
Emil Tabakov was born in Ruse, Bulgaria. In 1974 he studied at the Bulgarian State Music Academy with Todor Toshev, Marin Goleminov and Vladi Simeonov. He graduated with a diploma in conducting and double-bass in 1974 and in composition in 1978.

Tabakov's first engagement as a conductor was from 1976 to 1979 with the Rousse Philharmonic Orchestra. From 1979 to 1987 he served as music director and Conductor of the Sofia Soloists Chamber Orchestra. He was appointed Principal Conductor of the Sofia Philharmonic Orchestra in 1987, and again served in this position from 1998 to 2000. From 1994 to 2000 he was artistic director and Conductor of the Belgrade Philharmonic Orchestra. In 2014 he became the conductor of the Bulgarian National Radio Symphony Orchestra. In 1997 Tabakov served as Bulgarian Minister of Culture.

Tabakov mainly composes for large ensembles, including symphonies and instrumental concertos. His works are recorded and available on media.

Honors and awards
Winner of the Nikolai Malko International Competition for Young Conductors in Copenhagen (1977)
Musician of the Year of the Bulgarian National Radio (1992) 
"Crystal Lyre" (2009) Union of Musicians in Bulgaria. 
Nominated for "Man of the Year" (1992) by the International Bibliographic Centre in Cambridge, England

Selected works
Selected works include:

Orchestral
Symphony No. 1 (1981) (recorded on Balkanton and a second recording on Toccata Classics TOCC 0410)
Symphony No. 2 (1984) (recorded on Toccata Classics TOCC 0562)
Symphony No. 3 (1988) (recorded on Balkanton 030077)
Symphony No. 4 (1997) (recorded on Toccata Classics TOCC 0467)
Symphony No. 5 (2000) (recorded on Toccata Classics TOCC 0530)
Symphony No. 6 (2001) (recorded on Toccata Classics TOCC 0562)
Symphony No. 7 (2005) (recorded on Toccata Classics TOCC 0597)
Symphony No. 8 (2010) (recorded on Toccata Classics TOCC 0365)
Symphony No. 9 (2015) (recorded on Toccata Classics TOCC 0636)
Symphony No. 10 (2019)
Concert Piece (1985)
Astral Music (1978) (recorded on Elan)
Ad Infinitum (1992) (recorded on Gega)
Concerto for Orchestra (1995) (recorded on Gega GD 102)

Concertante
Concerto for 15 String Instruments (1979) (recorded on Elan and a second recording on Toccata Classics TOCC 0636)
Double-Bass Concerto (1975) (recorded on Toccata Classics TOCC 0530)
Percussion Concerto (1976), commissioned by the percussion ensemble Poliritmia
Concert Piece for trumpet and string orchestra (1985)
Concerto for two flutes and orchestra (2000), written for Patrick Gallois (recorded on Naxos 8.570073)
Piano Concerto (2003) (recorded on Naxos 8.570073)
Concerto for cello and orchestra (2006) (recorded on Gega)
Concerto for viola and orchestra (2007) (recorded on Toccata Classics TOCC 0410)

Chamber music
Sonata for viola and double bass (2005)
Sonata for double bass and piano
Etude (Етюд) for 12 double basses
Lamento for 12 double basses (2002)
Motivy (Мотиви) for double bass solo
Motivy 2 (Мотиви 2) for double bass solo (2005)
Prelude (Прелюд) for violin solo
Improvisation (Импровизация) for clarinet solo
Imagination (Въображения) for flute solo (2005)

Piano
Sonatina

Choral
Turnovgrad Cantata, for mezzo-soprano solo, 4 basses solo, narrator and orchestra (1976)
Requiem, for 4 soloists, chorus and orchestra (1994)
Concerto for Violin, Vibraphone, Marimba, Bells and Mixed Choir (1996), written for the famous Bulgarian violinist Mintcho Mintchev

References

External links
Official site

21st-century conductors (music)
Bulgarian conductors (music)
Serbian conductors (music)
1947 births
Living people
Bulgarian composers
People from Ruse, Bulgaria
20th-century classical composers
21st-century classical composers
20th-century conductors (music)